Dame Gillian Mary Millicent Wagner (née Graham; born 25 October 1927) is a British writer, philanthropist and social administrator, and formerly chair of the children’s charity Barnardo’s, the Thomas Coram Foundation and the Carnegie Trust. She has published biographical and historical works, as well as reports on social care.

Early life and education
Gillian Mary Millicent Graham was born in London in 1927, the daughter of Major Henry Archibald Roger Graham and Hon. Margaret Beatrice Lopes. She was educated at Cheltenham Ladies' College and the University of Geneva, and later did a diploma in social administration at the London School of Economics, and subsequently a Ph.D., Dr Barnardo and the Charity Organisation Society: A reassessment of the Arbitration Case of 1877.

Works and themes
Her 1979 biography of Dr Barnardo was the ‘first frank account of [his] character and career, and Thomas Coram, Gent. has been described as ‘a much-needed biography of this early pioneer of children’s charity.’ The exception to this is her most recent book, Miss Palmer’s Diary, a biography of her ancestor Ellen Palmer.

Publications
The Camera and Dr Barnardo   (with Valeria Lloyd) 1974, National Portrait Gallery Publications, 
Barnardo, 1979, Littlehampton Book Services, 
Children of the Empire, 1982, Littlehampton Book Services,  
The Chocolate Conscience, 1987, Chatto & Windus, 
Thomas Coram, Gent.: 1668–1751, 2015, Boydell Press, 
Miss Palmer’s Diary, 2017, I.B. Tauris,

Reports
A Positive Choice (Independent Review of Residential Care): A Guide to the Wagner Report 1988, National Institute for Social Work, ASIN B001NTUWO6
Residential Care, Vol. 2: The Research Reviewed (with the National Institute for Social Care) 1988, Stationery Office Books, 
Training for Social Care: Achieving Standards for the Undervalued Service, 1998, Policy Studies Institute,

References

1927 births
Living people
Alumni of the London School of Economics
Philanthropists from London
Women philanthropists
British women writers
Dames Commander of the Order of the British Empire